Toad is a common name for certain frogs, especially of the family Bufonidae, that are characterized by dry, leathery skin, short legs, and large bumps covering the parotoid glands.

A distinction between frogs and toads is not made in scientific taxonomy, but is common in popular culture (folk taxonomy), in which toads are associated with drier, rougher skin and more terrestrial habitats.

List of toad families 
In scientific taxonomy, toads include the true toads (Bufonidae) and various other terrestrial or warty-skinned frogs.

Non-bufonid "toads" can be found in the families:

 Bombinatoridae (fire-bellied toads and jungle toads)
 Calyptocephalellidae (helmeted water toad and false toads)
 Discoglossidae (midwife toads)
 Myobatrachidae (Australian toadlets)
 Pelobatidae (European spadefoot toad)
 Rhinophrynidae (burrowing toads)
 Scaphiopodidae (American spadefoot toads)
 Microhylidae (narrowmouth toads)

Biology 
Usually the largest of the bumps on the skin of a toad are those that cover the parotoid glands. The bumps are commonly called warts, but they have nothing to do with pathologic warts, being fixed in size, present on healthy specimens, and not caused by infection. It's a myth that handling toads causes warts.

Toads travel from non-breeding to breeding areas of ponds and lakes. Bogert (1947) suggests that the toads' call is the most important cue in the homing to ponds.
Toads, like many amphibians, exhibit breeding site fidelity (philopatry). Individual American toads return to their natal ponds to breed where they are likely to encounter siblings as potential mates. Although inbred examples within a species are possible, siblings rarely mate. Toads recognize and avoid mating with close kin. Advertisement vocalizations given by males appear to serve as cues by which females recognize kin. Kin recognition thus allows avoidance of inbreeding and consequent inbreeding depression.

Habitat 
In the United Kingdom common toads often climb trees to hide in hollows or in nest boxes.

Cultural depictions

 
In Kenneth Grahame's novel The Wind in the Willows (1908), Mr. Toad is a likeable and popular, if selfish and narcissistic, comic character. Mr. Toad reappears as the lead character in A. A. Milne's play Toad of Toad Hall (1929), based on the book.

In Chinese culture, the Money Toad (or Frog) Jin Chan appears as a Feng Shui charm for prosperity.

See also 

 True toad
 Common toad

References

External links 

 

Amphibian common names